The 2016–17 Greek Handball Premier was the 38th season of the Greek Handball Premier, Greece's premier handball league. It ran from 24 September 2016 to 27 May 2017.

Teams

A total of 12 teams participated in this year's edition of the Handball Premier. Of these, 10 sides qualified directly from the 2015–16 season and the play-off winners from each of the two groups of A2 Ethniki were promoted: Aris Nikaias from Group A and AESX Pylaia from Group B.

Poseidon Loutrakiou, despite finishing 5th in the last year's Handball Premier, announced the shutdown of their handball department and thus withdrew from the league. They were replaced by Serifato Aigio who beat GS Drama 1986 in a single, neutral venue play-off match. This was the first time for Serifato to compete in the top league.

Regular season

League table

Results

Championship play-offs
In the championship play-offs, the top four teams of the regular season play each other in a round robin format. However, they do not all start with 0 points. Instead, each team's sum of points is divided by two (rounded up if number is odd).

So, IEK Xini DIKEAS began the play-offs with 21 points, while Diomidis Argous, ASE Douka and AEK all began with 16 points.

Standings

Finals 
In the finals, teams playing against each other have to win three games to win the series. Thus, if one team wins three games before all five games have been played, the remaining games are omitted. The team that finished in the higher championship play-off place, is going to play the first, second and fifth (if necessary) game of the series at home.

Source: Hellenic Handball Federation

References

External links
Official website 

2016–17 domestic handball leagues
Handball in Greece
2016 in Greek sport
2017 in Greek sport